Eulogy is an unincorporated community in Bosque County, in the U.S. state of Texas. According to the Handbook of Texas, the community had a population of 45 in 2000.

History
Eulogy was founded by Charles Walker Smith when he moved his store there from the nearby ghost town of Brazos Point. It opened on July 11, 1884. A post office was established at Eulogy in 1885 and remained in operation until 1912. Its name was originally Smithville in honor of Uncle Billye Smith, but his sister, Julia, recommended it be changed to Eulogy since Uncle Billye was a eulogy to locals. Several businesses and retail establishments, such as three churches, a steam gristmill, and a cotton gin, operated in the area in the 1890s. There were only two businesses in the community in 1931 and both of them closed thirty years later. Its population was reported between 100 to 200 in the 1890s, fell to 93 in 1933, and plunged to 45 from 1974 through 2000.

Geography

Education
Eulogy's first school was established in the 1890s until it was replaced by a two-story wood building around 1900. Its top floor served as a meeting place for several associations. It burned in 1921 and was replaced by another building, this time with brick. It became a part of the Walnut Springs Independent School District and was used for community functions. The community continues to be served by Walnut Springs ISD today.

Notable person
 Samuel Murray Robinson, United States Navy four-star admiral who served in World War II, was born in Eulogy.

References

Unincorporated communities in Bosque County, Texas
Unincorporated communities in Texas